Mobile backend as a service (MBaaS), also known as "backend as a service", is a model for providing web app and mobile app developers with a way to link their applications to backend cloud storage and APIs exposed by back end applications while also providing features such as user management, push notifications, and integration with social networking services. These services are provided via the use of custom software development kits (SDKs) and application programming interfaces (APIs). BaaS is a relatively recent development in cloud computing, with most BaaS startups dating from 2011 or later.

Purpose 
Web and mobile apps require a similar set of features on the backend, including notification service, integration with social networks, and cloud storage. Each of these services has its own API that must be individually incorporated into an app, a process that can be time-consuming and complicated for app developers. BaaS providers form a bridge between the frontend of an application and various cloud-based backends via a unified API and SDK.

Providing a consistent way to manage backend data means that developers do not need to redevelop their own backend for each of the services that their apps need to access, potentially saving both time and money.

Although similar to other cloud-computing business models, such as software as a service (SaaS), infrastructure as a service (IaaS), and platform as a service (PaaS), BaaS is distinct from these other services in that it specifically addresses the cloud-computing needs of web and mobile app developers by providing a unified means of connecting their apps to cloud services.

Service providers 
Each BaaS provider offers a slightly different set of backend tools and resources. Among the most common services provided are notification service, file storage and sharing, integration with social networks such as Facebook and Twitter, location services, database persistence and queries, messaging and chat functions, user management, running business logic, and usage analysis tools.

BaaS providers have a broad focus, providing SDKs and APIs that work for app development on multiple platforms, such as iOS, Android, Blackberry, Windows Phone, HTML5, and others.

Business model 
BaaS providers generate revenue from their services in various ways, often using a freemium model. Under this model, a client receives a certain number of free active users or API calls per month, and pays a fee for each user or call over this limit. Alternatively, clients can pay a set fee for a package which allows for a greater number of calls or active users per month. There are also flat fee plans that make the pricing more predictable.
Some of the providers offer the unlimited API calls inside their free plan offerings.
While BaaS is most commonly offered as a commercial service, open-source options are available.

See also

References 

Mobile software development
As a service
Cloud applications
Software industry